The Best of Maynard Ferguson is the first compilation album and 13th overall by Canadian jazz trumpeter Maynard Ferguson on Columbia Records. The 1980 release opens with Maynard's biggest hit "Gonna Fly Now", before going on a tour of some of his best work for Columbia, featuring no less than 4 major theme songs along the way.

Critical reception 
The Best of Maynard Ferguson was not only an attempt to profit from Maynard's Columbia catalog while he was still in the public eye, it was an opportunity entice listeners to look beyond "Gonna Fly Now", and discover what came both before and after it. As AllMusic's Thom Jurek put it, "For the sake of argument, we'll look at this compilation as a decent if imperfect collection of the period of his greatest popularity..."

Track listing

Personnel 
 Liner notes – Mort Goode
 Design – Paula Scher
 Photography: David Gahr

References

External links 
 

1980 albums
Columbia Records albums
Maynard Ferguson albums